Stanislava or Stanisława is the female form of the Slavic given name Stanislav, which means  "one who achieves glory". It is most often found in the Slavic countries of central and eastern Europe. The name may refer to:

People
Stanisława Angel-Engelówna (1908–1958), Polish actress
Stanislava Brezovar (1937–2003), Slovenian ballerina
Stanislava Bubulytė (born 1945), Lithuanian rower
Stanisława Celińska (born 1947), Polish actress
Stanisława de Karłowska (1876–1952), Polish artist
Stanislava Jachnická (born 1965), Czech actress
Stana Katić, Canadian actress
Stanislava Komarova (born 1986), Russian swimmer
Stanisława Leszczyńska (1896–1974), Polish midwife
Stanislava Nopova (born 1953), Czech writer
Stanisława Nowicka (1905–1990), Polish dancer and singer
Stanisława Anna Okularczyk (born 1943), Polish politician
Stanisława Perzanowska (1898–1982), Polish actress
Stanisława Prządka (born 1943), Polish politician
Stanisława Przybyszewska (1901–1935), Polish writer
Stanislava Součková (1923–1997), Czech singer
Stanisława Umińska (1901–1977), Polish actress
Stanisława Walasiewicz (1911–1980), Polish athlete
Stanisława Wysocka (1877–1941), Polish actress
Stanisława Zawadzka (1890–1988), Polish singer

See also
Stanislav (given name)
Polish name
Slavic names

Slavic feminine given names
Czech feminine given names
Slovak feminine given names
Slovene feminine given names
Belarusian feminine given names
Polish feminine given names
Russian feminine given names
Serbian feminine given names
Croatian feminine given names